Gaetano Milanesi (1813-1895) was an Italian scholar and writer on the history of art.

Biography
Milanesi was born at Siena, where he studied law, and in 1838 he obtained an appointment in the public library.

In 1856 he was elected member of the Accademia della Crusca, in which capacity he took part in the compilation of its famous but still unfinished dictionary, and two years later was appointed assistant keeper of the Tuscan archives, in Florence; then he took charge of the famous Medici archives, whence he collected a vast body of material on the history of Italian art, not all of which is yet published. In 1889 he became director of the archives, but retired in 1892, and died three years later.

His most important publication is his edition of Vasari's works in nine volumes, with copious and valuable notes (Florence, 1878 1885). Of his other writings the following may be mentioned:
Il diario inedito di Alessandro Sozzini (in the Archivio storico Italiano, 1842)
Documenti per la storia dell' arte senese, 3 vols. (Siena, 1854-1856)
Discorsi sulla storia civile et artistica di Siena (Siena, 1862)
He also edited a number of Italian classics.

References

1813 births
1895 deaths
People from Siena
19th-century Italian historians
Italian art historians
Italian male non-fiction writers
19th-century Italian male writers